Garmisch-Partenkirchen train crash may refer to:

 Garmisch-Partenkirchen train collision, 1995
 Garmisch-Partenkirchen train derailment, 2022